Mwansa is a surname. Notable people with the surname include:

Kalombo Mwansa (born 1955), Zambian politician
Kenny Mwansa (born 1949), Zambian boxer
Natasha Wang Mwansa (born 2001), Zambian student, journalist, and activist
Sebastian Mwansa (born 1988), Zambian footballer
Tolomeo Mwansa (1941–2014), Zambian footballer